The 1975–76 OMJHL season was the second season of the Ontario Major Junior Hockey League (OMJHL). The Windsor Spitfires were added as an expansion team, becoming the twelfth team in the league. The OMJHL splits into two divisions of six teams each. The southern and western teams joined the Emms division, named for Hap Emms. The northern and eastern teams joined the Leyden division, named for Matt Leyden. The OMJHL created three new trophies for the season. The Emms Trophy and the Leyden Trophy are awarded to the regular season champion of their respective divisions. The F. W. "Dinty" Moore Trophy (named for Francis Moore) is inaugurated for the first-year goaltender with the best goals-against-average. Twelve teams each played 66 games. The Hamilton Fincups won the J. Ross Robertson Cup, defeating the Sudbury Wolves.

League business
On May 9, 1975, officials from the OMJHL, Quebec Major Junior Hockey League and the Western Canada Hockey League, announced a constitution to establish the Canadian Major Junior Hockey League (CMJHL) composed of the three league under one umbrella. The new organization wanted standard contracts for all players, consistent dollar amounts for development fees paid by the professional leagues, and for the National Hockey League and the World Hockey Association to work together on a common drafting program to eliminate bidding wars. The CMJHL sought to represent players directly instead of agents, and proposed an escalating development fee schedule if professional teams wanted to sign a player while he was still eligible for junior hockey. The league also proposed to allow some players under professional contracts to continue playing in junior hockey. OMJHL commissioner Tubby Schmalz defended the validity of the constitution, despite a challenge from Alan Eagleson that it violated antitrust laws in Canada and the United States.

In November 1975, Schmalz decreed that future OMJHL games were to be attended by least two off-duty police officers as a deterrent to violence on ice or among the spectators. The statement was in response to incidents from a game involving the London Knights and the St. Catharines Black Hawks. Problems in getting development payments from professional leagues continued, and Schmalz announced the possibility of legal action to recover delinquent fees for drafting junior-aged players.

Regular season

Standings

Scoring leaders

Playoffs

First round
Sault Ste. Marie Greyhounds defeat Oshawa Generals 3–2

Kitchener Rangers defeat St. Catharines Black Hawks 3–1

Quarterfinals
Sudbury Wolves defeat Sault Ste. Marie Greyhounds 4–2, 1 tie

Ottawa 67's defeat Kingston Canadians 4–2, 1 tie

Hamilton Fincups defeat Kitchener Rangers 4–0

Toronto Marlboros defeat London Knights 4–1

Semifinals
Sudbury Wolves defeat Ottawa 67's 4–1

Hamilton Fincups defeat Toronto Marlboros 4–0, 1 tie

J. Ross Robertson Cup
Hamilton Fincups defeat Sudbury Wolves 4–2

Awards

See also
List of OHA Junior A standings
List of OHL seasons
1976 Memorial Cup
1976 NHL Entry Draft
1975 in sports
1976 in sports

References

External links
HockeyDB

Ontario Hockey League seasons
OMJHL